Soudley is a small village in Shropshire in the civil parish of Cheswardine. The village had a pub called The Wheatsheaf until it was destroyed by fire. There is also a small disused Methodist chapel.

Villages in Shropshire